The Robert Schuman Roundabout, sometimes called Robert Schuman Square, is a roundabout at the end of the Rue de la Loi/Wetstraat in Brussels, Belgium, that serves as a focus for major institutions of the European Union (EU). It is named after Robert Schuman, one of the founding fathers of the European Union and gives its name to the surrounding district (also known as the European Quarter) and Schuman station.

Location and buildings
The Robert Schuman Roundabout is in the centre of Brussels' European Quarter. The major buildings next to it are the Berlaymont building (headquarters of the European Commission), and the Justus Lipsius building (used to hold low-level meetings of the Council of the European Union and provide office space to the Council's Secretariat) and numerous other EU offices.

Accessibility and future
The roundabout is above the eastern end of the metro segment of Schuman station. The station is undergoing renovation to improve its interchange and link it to a new regional railway via a new tunnel. There are already a web of rail and road tunnels running under and around the roundabout. The area is to see some major rebuilding as EU offices are converted into shops and other civilian uses and the roundabout will be converted into one of three pedestrian squares, the theme of the new Schuman Square will concentrate on "policy and politics" (see Brussels and the EU#Future for details).

Roads meeting at the roundabout
 The Rue de la Loi/Wetstraat runs west–north–west towards the centre of Brussels, one-way. It also continues east–south–east for a short distance towards the western end of the Parc du Cinquantenaire/Jubelpark. The bulk of the traffic on this main carriageway avoids the roundabout by taking the tunnel underneath, the road becoming the Avenue de Tervueren/Tervurenlaan and heading out of Brussels east/east–south–east towards Woluwe-Saint-Pierre and eventually Tervuren.
 The / leads north–east towards Schaerbeek and the /. The Rue Belliard/Belliardstraat tunnel also follows this route, leading out towards Diamant premetro station and the E40.
 The / leads north towards the /.
 The / runs south–east through the middle of Etterbeek, towards the La Chasse junction and Auderghem.
 The / is one of the smaller roads leaving the roundabout, heading towards the /.

See also

 History of Brussels
 Belgium in "the long nineteenth century"

References

Squares in Brussels
City of Brussels
European quarter of Brussels